James Murray, Earl of Dunbar (–1770) was a Jacobite.

Family 
He was the second child of David Murray, 5th Viscount of Stormont and Majory Scott.  His brothers included David Murray, 6th Viscount of Stormont and the First Earl of Mansfield.

Life 
His father's family was Protestant but Jacobite in its politics, and James was no exception.  From 1711 to 1713 he was Member of Parliament for Dumfriesshire but, apparently mixed up in some of the plots of the time, he later went to join the court of the exiled Stuarts.  He was reportedly both ambitious and a holder of grudges.

In 1719 James Murray turned the Jacobite court in Rome into (in Maurice Bruce's words) "a hotbed of intrigue" and, during the subsequent imprisonment of his enemy the Earl of Mar in Geneva from May 1719 to June 1720, he served as Secretary of State to James Francis Edward Stuart ("King James III & VIII") (the "Old Pretender"), but gained enemies in the Jacobite court (including Mar) and was sent away from Rome in 1720.  Nevertheless, he never wholly lost favour with the Pretender, who created him Earl of Dunbar in 1721, Knight of the Order of Thistle in 1725 and Governor and tutor to the Prince of Wales sometime in 1726, confirming it on 4 June 1727.  At the same time John Hay of Cromlix was made secretary of state, and his wife Marjorie (James Murray's sister) made Charles' governess (though the Hays resigned their posts in 1727).

Murray and Bishop Atterbury co-operated in Mar's final fall from Jacobite favour in 1724 and, though he and Atterbury came into conflict between 1725 and 1728, the quarrel was soon patched up.  In 1747 James Murray retired to Avignon, where there was a significant community of Jacobites, living there until his death.

Murray's daughter Mary Murray married Colonel Ligonier or Ligunier, and their daughter Frances married a Colonel Thomas Balfour.

References 

1690 births
1770 deaths
Scottish Jacobites
Members of the Parliament of Great Britain for Scottish constituencies
Tory MPs (pre-1834)
James
Peers created by James Francis Edward Stuart
Dunbar, James Murray, 1st Earl of
Younger sons of viscounts
British MPs 1710–1713
British MPs 1713–1715